"Shine On You Crazy Diamond" is a nine-part Pink Floyd composition written by David Gilmour, Roger Waters, and Richard Wright.  It appeared on Pink Floyd's 1975 concept album Wish You Were Here. The song is written about and dedicated to Syd Barrett, who left the band in 1968 because of deteriorating mental health.

Background
The song was conceived and written as a tribute and remembrance to Pink Floyd founding member Syd Barrett. Barrett was eased out of the band in 1968 because of his drug use and troubled mental health, which had affected his ability to integrate with the other band members and create and perform as a musician. He was replaced by his former school friend David Gilmour, who had initially been brought in as second guitarist. The remaining band members felt guilty about having removed him, but although they admired Barrett's creativity, they were concerned about his severe mental decline and felt it had been necessary. "Shine on You Crazy Diamond" was first performed on Pink Floyd's 1974 French tour and was recorded for their 1975 concept album Wish You Were Here. The track was originally intended to be a side-long composition, like "Atom Heart Mother" and "Echoes", but was ultimately split into two parts and used to bookend the album, with other newly composed material acting as a bridge.

Recording
Bassist Roger Waters commented, as the sessions were underway, that "at times the group was there only physically. Our bodies were there, but our minds and feelings somewhere else." Eventually an idea was raised to split the song in two, Parts I–V and Parts VI–IX.

According to guitarist David Gilmour and drummer Nick Mason on the Wish You Were Here episode of In the Studio with Redbeard, Pink Floyd recorded a satisfactory take of "Shine On You Crazy Diamond" but because of a new mixing console which was installed at Abbey Road Studios, it needed to be re-recorded because excessive 'bleed' from other instruments could be heard on the drum tracks. As explained by Gilmour,

On part 3, a piano part seems to have been added "live" to the final mix, making it absent from multitrack masters. That part was re-recorded at British Grove Studios by pianist Richard Wright during the multi-channel mix used for the album Immersion Edition and the SACD release.

Nick Mason said:

The song would be the first song to be started and the last song to be recorded for the album. On 24 February, a sequence that was titled "Wine Glasses" was overdubbed onto part 1 of the song, titled after how the band used wine glasses to record it. The sequence was recorded on 5 January 1971, originally intended to be a part of a series of musical experiments the band conducted titled "Nothings".

Barrett's studio appearance

One day during recording in June 1975, Barrett (now heavyset, with a completely shaved head and eyebrows) wandered into the studio (although Mason has since stated that he is not entirely certain whether "Shine On You Crazy Diamond" was the particular work being recorded when Barrett was there). Because of his drastically changed appearance, the band did not recognise him for some time. When they eventually realised that the withdrawn man in the corner was Barrett, Roger Waters became so distressed about Barrett's appearance that he was reduced to tears. Someone asked to play the suite again for Barrett and he said a second playback was not needed when they had just heard it.  When asked what he thought of the song, Barrett said it sounded a "bit old". He subsequently slipped away during celebrations for Gilmour's wedding to Ginger Hasenbein, which took place later that day. Gilmour confirmed this story, although he could not recall which composition they were working on when Barrett showed up.

The episode is taken up by Wright as follows:

Composition

As neither the original 1975 vinyl release nor the CD re-release actually delineate the various parts precisely, the make-up of the parts below is based on a comparison of the recorded timings with the identifications in the published sheet music.

The song is in G natural minor (Aeolian) scale, but with hints of the G Dorian mode with the inclusion of the E (raised sixth) note in various parts throughout, most prominently in the four-note theme in Part II. Gilmour's solos are largely blues-inspired, with a few notes hinting the inclusion of the G melodic minor scale.

Parts I–V
Part I (Wright, Gilmour, Waters; from 0:00 to 3:54) There are no lyrics in Part I. The instrumental begins with a fade-in of a G minor chord created with an EMS VCS 3, ARP Solina string synthesizer, a Hammond organ, and a wine glass harp (recycled from an earlier project known as Household Objects). This is followed by Wright's Minimoog passages leading into a lengthy, bluesy guitar solo played by Gilmour on a Fender Stratocaster (neck pickup) using a heavily compressed sound and reverb. Part I ends with the synthesizer chord fading into the background. During the fade-out, some very faint conversation in the studio can be heard on the left channel, although this has not been confirmed.

Part II (Gilmour, Waters, Wright; from 3:54 to 6:27) begins with a four-note theme (B♭, F, G [below the B♭], E) (known informally as "Syd's theme") repeated throughout much of the entire section. This theme leads the harmony to C major (in comparison to the use of C minor in Part I). Mason starts his drumming and Waters his bass playing after the fourth playing of the four-note theme, which is the point where the riffs get into a fixed tempo, in 6/8 time. The chord leads back to G minor (as from Part I), followed by E♭ major and D major back to a coda from G minor. This part includes another solo by Gilmour.

Part III (Wright, Gilmour, Waters; from 6:27 to 8:41) begins with a Minimoog solo by Wright accompanied by a less complex variation of Mason's drums from Part II. This part includes Gilmour's third guitar solo, in the G natural minor scale, and ends with a fade into Part IV. When performed on the Animals tour, Gilmour added distortion to the guitar for this solo. This solo is often dropped in live performances while the rest of part III is still played—notably on Delicate Sound of Thunder and Pulse.

Part IV (Gilmour, Wright, Waters; from 8:41 to 11:10) Waters sings his lyrics, with Gilmour, Wright and backing vocalists Venetta Fields and Carlena Williams on harmonies.

Part V (Waters, Gilmour, Wright; from 11:10 to 13:32) Part IV is followed by two guitars repeating an arpeggio variation on the main theme for about a minute with the theme of Part II. A baritone saxophone overlays the sounds, played by Dick Parry. The saxophone changes from a baritone to a tenor saxophone, as a time signature switch from 6/8 to 12/8 creates the feeling that the tempo doubles up. The sax solo is accompanied by a Solina string synthesizer keyboard sound. A machine-like hum fades in with musique concrète and segues into "Welcome to the Machine".

Parts VI–IX
Part VI (Wright, Waters, Gilmour; from 0:00 to 4:39) begins with a howling wind from the preceding song "Wish You Were Here". As the wind fades away, Gilmour comes in on the bass guitar. Waters adds another bass with a continuing riff pattern. Then Wright comes in playing a Solina String Ensemble Synthesizer and after a few measures, several rhythm guitar parts (Gilmour played the power chord rhythm part using his black Fender Stratocaster before switching to lap steel guitar for the solo in live performances from 1974–77. Snowy White performed the rhythm guitar parts on this track on the band's 1977 "In the Flesh" tour) and drums come in, as well as a Minimoog to play the opening solo. At the two-minute mark, Wright's Minimoog and Gilmour's lap steel guitar play notes in unison before Gilmour performs a lap steel guitar solo (the lap steel had open G tuning with the high D string tuned to E) with some counterpointing from Wright's synthesizers. It lasts for about three minutes (four when played on the band's "In the Flesh" tour) and Gilmour played each section an octave higher than the previous one. The highest note he hit on the lap steel/slide solo was a B♭6, followed by a reprise of the guitar solo from Part IV (which was played by White live on Pink Floyd's 1977 tour so Gilmour could switch back to his Fender Stratocaster). The song then switches time signatures to 6/8 (found in Parts II–V), giving the appearance of a slower tempo and reintroducing the vocals.

Part VII (Gilmour, Wright, Waters; from 4:39 to 6:03) contains the vocals, in a similar vein to Part IV though half the length, before segueing into Part VIII. Waters again sings the lead vocals with Gilmour, Wright, Fields and Williams providing backing vocals.

Part VIII (Gilmour, Wright, Waters; from 6:03 to 9:00) brings in Waters to play a second electric guitar for a high-noted sound riff while Gilmour plays the arpeggio riff that bridges Parts VII and VIII. A solid progression of funk in 4/4 plays for about two minutes before very slowly fading out as a single sustained keyboard note fades in around the nine-minute mark. Throughout this section, Wright's keyboards dominate, with the use of a Minimoog synthesizer, and a Hohner Clavinet. Originally the section clocked in at 8 minutes before it was edited down to three minutes on the final version (the unedited Part 8 without the electric piano and Minimoog overdubs surfaced on a bootleg called The Extraction Tapes). When performed on the "In the Flesh" tour in 1977, the section would be extended to between 5 and 10 minutes as it would feature guitar solos from Gilmour (which would vary from funky power chords to a proper solo as the Animals tour progressed) and Snowy White. In addition to their guitar solos, there was also occasional trading of leads from Gilmour and White instead of the keyboard sounds as heard on record.

Part IX (Wright, from 9:00 to 12:28) is played in 4/4 time. Gilmour described Part IX as "a slow 4/4 funeral march... the parting musical eulogy to Syd". Again, Wright's keyboards dominate, with little guitar input from Gilmour. Mason's drums play for much of this part, and the keyboards play for the final minute before fading out. On the fade-out, a short keyboard part of the melody of "See Emily Play" (at 12:07), one of Barrett's signature Pink Floyd songs, can be heard. Part IX, and the album, ends in G major, a Picardy third. When performed early on the Animals tour, the part begins with the piano (as heard on record) then the synth solo is played (as on record) by Dick Parry with some slide guitar accompaniment by Snowy White would then change to half synthesizer/half harmony lead guitar solo for the remainder of European leg and first US leg. For the final US leg, after the piano began it was a bluesy guitar solo from Gilmour then harmony guitars from Gilmour and White (Gilmour playing the highest parts) and then ending like on record. This was the final solo writing credit Wright would receive in Pink Floyd during his lifetime, as well as his last writing credit of any kind until The Division Bell in 1994.

Live performances

The song series was first performed as "Shine On", during the band's French tour in June 1974. It was introduced as "Shine On You Crazy Diamond" on the British tour in November 1974. The set was originally performed as one whole suite with some of the parts differing from the album versions, and samplings of Barrett's solo song "Dark Globe" during the opening of the performance. The version from the British tour was included on the 2011 Experience and Immersion editions of Wish You Were Here. The multi-part version of "Shine On You Crazy Diamond" was first performed on the band's 1975 North American tour with "Have a Cigar" in between the two halves of the piece. The 1975 versions were close to the final versions, except parts one and nine were still not refined yet. The band performed the whole nine-part "Shine On You Crazy Diamond" as part of the Wish You Were Here portion of their 1977 In the Flesh Tour, with extra musicians White on guitar and backing vocals and Parry on saxophones.

Parts I–V became a staple of Floyd's performances from 1987 to 1994. The track opened shows for most of the A Momentary Lapse of Reason tour of 1987–89 and the tour closing performance at Knebworth in 1990 with Candy Dulfer on saxophone. The first eleven performances had "Echoes" as the show opener before the band proceeded to play all of A Momentary Lapse of Reason in the rest of the first half in a slightly different sequence to the album. A condensed edition of the track (without the Gilmour solo in Part III) would then open the second half of the shows on the group's 1994 The Division Bell tour, except in shows where all of The Dark Side of the Moon was performed, in which case "Shine On You Crazy Diamond" opened the first half of the concert. In the last month and a half of the tour, the band added part VII to Parts I–V (as documented on the live album Pulse). A similar version was also played during David Gilmour's Rattle That Lock Tour in 2015 with the according screen film on display.

Gilmour performed almost the whole suite (save part IX) at his 2001 and 2002 semi-unplugged concerts (documented on his 2002 David Gilmour in Concert DVD). "There was," he said, "a moment of thinking, 'Shall I attempt an acoustic guitar version of the long, synthesised opening?' It came to me one day how I could do it, and it worked out not too badly."

Gilmour performed parts I–II and IV–V (in a new arrangement) on his 2006 On an Island solo tour. Part III was omitted and Parts I and II were simplified and more guitar-focused. Gilmour performed Parts I–V on his Live in Gdańsk album on disc two and on the DVD in the four-disc edition of the album. The five-disc edition and the online downloads available in the three and four-disc editions include Parts I–V recorded in Venice and Vienne in 2006. In many of his performances, solo and with Pink Floyd, Gilmour alters the vocal melody to avoid the higher notes that were originally sung by Waters.

Waters has also performed the epic on his 1999 and 2000 tours documented on his In the Flesh – Live album and DVD which was a condensed parts I, II, IV, VI, VII, and IX. Part VI on these performances had a lap steel solo from Jon Carin then guitar solos from Doyle Bramhall II and White. Then on Waters' 2002 tour, he played all nine parts like on record (although part VIII was shortened). An abridged version of parts I–V was performed on Waters' 2006–07 The Dark Side of the Moon Live tour, Waters also performed the song on the 2016 concerts, including the free concert of the Mexico City's Zócalo, and the concert at the Desert Trip festival; besides the parts VI–IX, Waters performed all the Wish You Were Here album live in order. During Waters' 2022 tour, he played the B side of Wish You Were Here in order, including the epic's parts VI through VIII (excluding part IX) but dropped Part VIII after a few shows to end with Part V.

Personnel
Roger Waters – bass guitar, lead vocals, additional electric guitar on Part VIII, glass harp
David Gilmour – electric guitars, backing vocals, Fender Stringmaster pedal steel guitar, additional bass guitar on Part VI, EMS Synthi AKS, glass harp
Richard Wright – Hammond organ, ARP String Ensemble, Minimoog, quadruple-tracked EMS VCS 3, clavinet and electric piano on Part VIII, Steinway piano on Parts III and IX, glass harp, backing vocals, Bösendorfer piano on the multi-channel re-release (recorded in 2008).
Nick Mason – drums, percussion

with:
Dick Parry – baritone and tenor saxophones
Carlena Williams – backing vocals
Venetta Fields – backing vocals

Releases
"Shine On You Crazy Diamond" features on all the below releases:

Albums
Wish You Were Here (Original release) – Pink Floyd, 1975
A Collection of Great Dance Songs (Edited version) – Pink Floyd, 1981
Delicate Sound of Thunder (Live version, Parts I–V) – Pink Floyd, 1988
PULSE (Live version, Parts I–V and VII) – Pink Floyd, 1995
In the Flesh – Live (Live version, Parts I–VIII) – Roger Waters, 2000
Echoes: The Best of Pink Floyd (Edited version) – Pink Floyd, 2001
Live in Gdańsk (Live version, Parts I, II, IV & V) – David Gilmour, 2008
Wish You Were Here 2011 remastered "Experience" and "Immersion" sets (early live version recorded in November 1974) – Pink Floyd, 2011
A Foot in the Door – The Best of Pink Floyd (Edited version, Parts I–V) – Pink Floyd, 2011
Live at Pompeii (Live version, Parts I–II, IV–V) – David Gilmour, 2017

Video/DVD/BD
Delicate Sound of Thunder (VHS, Part I only) – Pink Floyd, 1988
PULSE (VHS and DVD, Parts I–V and VII) – Pink Floyd, 1995 (VHS) 2006 (DVD)
In the Flesh – Live (DVD, Parts I–VIII) – Roger Waters, 2000
David Gilmour in Concert (DVD, Parts I–II, IV–V and VI–VII, reprise of Part V) – David Gilmour, 2002
Remember That Night (DVD and BD, Parts I–II and IV–V) – David Gilmour, 2007
Live in Gdańsk 3-disc, 4-disc and deluxe editions (Parts I–II, IV–V) – David Gilmour, 2008
Live at Pompeii (DVD, BD and deluxe edition, Parts I–II, IV–V) – David Gilmour, 2017

Use in other media 
In December 2018, the song was the subject of an episode of BBC Radio 4's Soul Music, examining its cultural influence, including an interview with Gilmour about how the song was created.

References

External links

[ William Ruhlmann review of Shine On You Crazy Diamond]
Hubble Ultra Deep Field video featuring Part 1 of the song

Pink Floyd songs
1975 songs
Suites (music)
Songs written by David Gilmour
Songs written by Roger Waters
Songs written by Richard Wright (musician)
Song recordings produced by David Gilmour
Song recordings produced by Roger Waters
Song recordings produced by Richard Wright (musician)
Song recordings produced by Nick Mason
Songs about Syd Barrett
1975 neologisms
Quotations from music
British progressive rock songs